Justine Dkhar is an Indian politician from the state of Meghalaya and represents the Khliehrait constituency in the East Jaintia Hills district in the Meghalaya Legislative Assembly during 2013–2018.

References

Meghalaya politicians
Living people
People from East Jaintia Hills district
Meghalaya MLAs 2013–2018
People from Khliehrait
Year of birth missing (living people)
Bharatiya Janata Party politicians from Meghalaya